This is a list of Eastern Illinois Panthers football players in the NFL Draft.

Key

Selections

Notable undrafted players
Note: No drafts held before 1936

References

Eastern Illinois

Eastern Illinois Panthers NFL Draft